Downtown Evansville is the central business district of Evansville, Indiana. The boundaries of downtown Evansville have changed as the city has grown, but they are generally considered to be between Canal Street at the south and east, the Lloyd Expressway to the north, Pigeon Creek to the northwest, and the Ohio River to the southeast south and southwest. Downtown Evansville is entirely within Pigeon Township.

The district constitutes Evansville's government, cultural and business center. The Evansville Civic Center houses the administrative offices for the city and Vanderburgh County. Berry Plastics, Vectren, and Old National Bank, the largest financial services bank holding company headquartered in Indiana, have corporate headquarters in downtown Evansville with Mead Johnson's headquarters just west of Downtown.

History
Evansville's original downtown plat was made on about 200 acres, with streets running parallel to the river from northwest to southeast. Other streets nearby were laid out on the cardinal points, due north-south and east-west. Thus, anyone entering or leaving downtown finds that the street makes a confusing oblique-angle turn in one direction or another.

In the 1970s, the city suffered from problems such as decreased economic activity and suburban flight, but city-sponsored revitalization has since improved downtown conditions.

Entertainment venues and attractions
Victory Theatre is a vintage 1,950-seat venue that is home to the Evansville Philharmonic Orchestra and hosts other concerts and events. A wide variety of concerts, plays, and other special events are held at the 2,500-seat auditorium at The Centre. Downtown is also home to the Children's Museum of Evansville, Evansville Museum, and Tropicana, with the LST-325 Museum located just south of Downtown at the nearby Indiana-Kentucky State Line.   The Ford Center is a new arena opened in 2011 located near The Centre.

Other landmarks

References

External links 
 http://www.evansvillecvb.org/
 http://www.vanderburghgov.org/
 http://www.city-data.com/city/Evansville-Indiana.html

Geography of Evansville, Indiana
Tourist attractions in Evansville, Indiana
Evansville